Perilla nankinensis may refer to:
 Perilla nankinensis  – synonym of Perilla frutescens var. crispa
 Perilla nankinensis  – synonym of Plectranthus scutellarioides